Andrea Breder (born 7 December 1964) is a retired West German high jumper, born in Saarbrücken.

She won the 1981 European Junior Championships, finished seventh at the 1982 European Indoor Championships and tenth at the 1984 European Indoor Championships She represented the sports club SV Saar 05 Saarbrücken, and became West German indoor champion in 1982. She also became long jump champion, in 1987.

Her personal best jump was 1.93 metres, achieved in August 1981 in Koblenz.

References

1964 births
Living people
Sportspeople from Saarbrücken
West German female high jumpers